Charles Frederick Ashley Cooper Ponsonby, 2nd Baron de Mauley (12 September 1815 – 24 August 1896), was a British peer and Liberal politician.

Ponsonby was the son of the first Lord de Mauley, the third son of the third Earl of Bessborough, and Lady Barbara Ashley-Cooper, only child and heiress of the fifth Earl of Shaftesbury. He attended Trinity College, Cambridge.

On 9 August 1838, he married his cousin, Lady Maria Ponsonby, a daughter of John Ponsonby, 4th Earl of Bessborough, and they had 10 children:

 Alice Barbara Maria (1840–1846)
 Emily Priscilla Maria (1841–1926), married Rev. Charles Ogilvy
 William Ashley Webb (1843–1918)
 George (1844–1845)
 Maurice John George (1846–1945), married Hon. Madeleine Hanbury-Tracy
 Frederick John William (1847–1933), married Margaret Howard (a great-granddaughter of Frederick Howard, 5th Earl of Carlisle)
 Mary Alice (1849–?)
 Edwin Charles William (1851–1939), married (1) Emily Coope, (2) Hilda Smith
 Helen Geraldine (1852–1949), married Sholto Douglas, 19th Earl of Morton
 Diana Isabel Maria (1855–?)

References

External links 
 

1815 births
1896 deaths
Charles Ponsonby, 2nd Baron de Mauley
Ponsonby, Charles
Ponsonby, Charles
Ponsonby, Charles
Ponsonby, Charles
Ponsonby, Charles
UK MPs who inherited peerages
Ponsonby, Charles
Ponsonby, Charles
Charles
Eldest sons of British hereditary barons